Carole Dieschbourg (born 1977) is a Luxembourg politician and writer. Since December 2013, she has been Minister for the Environment representing the Green in the government coalition consisting of the Democratic Party, the Luxembourg Socialist Workers' Party and the Green Party. She represented Luxembourg at the COP22 Climate Change Conference in Marrakesh, November 2016.

Biography
Born in Ettelbruck on 3 October 1977, Dieschbourg matriculated from the Lycée classique d'Echternach in 1997 before studying historical sciences and German at the University of Trier, earning a Master of Arts in 2005. In 2005, she became coordinator of "Moulins – inventaire, excursion et sentier régional" (Mills – inventory, excursion and regional trail) under the Leader + Müllerthal programme, publishing Die Mühlen des Müllerthals (The Mullerthal Mills) in 2007.

In 2011, Dieschbourg entered politics as a municipal councillor in Echternach. Following the elections on 20 October 2013, she joined the Luxembourg government, becoming Minister for the Environment on 4 December 2013. Prior to her governmental appointment, she was a board member of Moulin J.P. Dieschbourg, a family business established in 1897.

Interviewed by Romain Van Dyck in the Luxembourg newspaper Le Quotidien on 7 November 2016, she stressed the importance of arriving at a European position at the Climate Conference in Marrakesh rather than agreements with individual countries. Luxembourg would above all be contributing by bringing about a major reduction in carbon emissions from road vehicles. She announced that the country would have 800 recharging facilities for electric cars by 2020 compared with 3,000 for the whole of France.

Other activities
 World Economic Forum (WEF), Member of the Europe Policy Group (since 2017)

Publications
Dieschbourg, Carole. 2007. Die Mühlen des Müllerthals. Editions Guy Binsfeld. .

References

1977 births
People from Ettelbruck
Luxembourgian politicians
Luxembourgian writers
Luxembourgian women writers
Ministers for the Environment of Luxembourg
Women government ministers of Luxembourg
Living people
21st-century Luxembourgian women politicians
21st-century Luxembourgian politicians
The Greens (Luxembourg) politicians
20th-century Luxembourgian writers
21st-century Luxembourgian writers
20th-century Luxembourgian women writers
21st-century Luxembourgian women writers